The 2007 UCI Cyclo-cross World Championships – Women's elite race was held on Sunday 28 January 2007 as a part of the 2007 UCI Cyclo-cross World Championships in Hooglede-Gits, Belgium.

Summary 

With defending champion Marianne Vos unable to keep up with the pace and her compatriot Daphny van den Brand crashing in the early stage of the race top favourite Hanka Kupfernagel started great and took the lead. Halfway through the race she suffered a mechanical problem and was dropped back. As a result two French outsiders Maryline Salvetat and Laurence Leboucher were in the lead alongside surprising American Katie Compton. In the final round Leboucher dropped the pace and Compton had to close the gap towards Salvetat, but eventually failed, resulting in the rainbow jersey for Salvetat. Compton clinched the silver and Leboucher won a bronze medal.

Ranking 

Dorota Warczyk from Poland abandoned the race.

Notes

External links
 Union Cycliste Internationale

UCI Cyclo-cross World Championships – Women's elite race
2007 in cyclo-cross
Women's elite race